Milko Šparemblek (born December 1, 1928) is a Slovenian-born Croatian dancer, choreographer, stage director and film director. He has made about 40 ballet films and has about 150 premiers of his work in over 50 theatres around the world. He has received a number of awards including a Vladimir Nazor Lifetime Achievement Award and a Distinguished Artist Award from the International Society for the Performing Arts.

Early life
Šparemblek was born in Prevalje, Slovenia, as an only child. At the age of three, his family moved to Zagreb, Croatia to a neighbourhood called Kustošija. He enrolled in the V. high school of Zagreb and participated in athletics. He attended the University of Zagreb to study Comparative literature, that same year starting to dance at the Zagreb Opera (later known as the Croatian National Theatre) under the direction of choreographers and dancers Ana Roje and Oskar Harmoš.

Career around the work

In 1948 Šparemblek joined the Croatian Ballet ensemble at the Croatian National Theatre where he studied classical, contemporary and folkloric dances. Four years later in 1952, he was promoted to Ballet Soloist by recommendation of Dame Ninette de Valois and in 1953 he left Zagreb for Paris on a Franco-Yugoslav Scholarship. He studied under Olga Preobrajenska, a graduate of the Imperial Ballet School in Moscow, and later under Serge Peretti in the Paris Opera School of Ballet. After completing his scholarship, he began dancing in small cabarets, music halls and working as an extra in movie production in order to pay for his studies.

Šparemblek became a member of several different ballet companies, including the Janine Charrat company, the Maurice Béjart company, the Ballet de l'Étoile, the Milorad Miskovitch company and the Ludmila Tcherina company. In 1956 he choreographed his first ballet called "L'Échelle".

In New York he studied contemporary dance techniques under Jose Limon and Marhe Graham.

Career as a choreographer
He was a Ballet Master in Bruxelles under the director M. Bejart in the Ballet de XX. Sc.
He was a Director of the Lisbon Gulbekian Ballet and he was a Director of Ballet in the New York Metropolitan Opera
Director of Ballet in the Lyon Opera the Lyon. In 1985, he choreographed Pastoral - 6th Symphony of Beethoven - world premiére, for the ballet company Ballet Teatro Guaíra, in the city of Curitiba, state of Paraná, in Brazil, which was also performed in Rio de Janeiro and São Paulo. He was also a director of Ballet in the Zagreb Croatian National Theatre, where in 2012 he choreographed the Miraculous Mandarin, and in 2014 he choreographed a production of the comedy "The good soul of Sichuan"  by the Zagreb Municipal Theatre.

Awards

Television and film production

References

1928 births
Living people
Choreographers
Croatian male ballet dancers
Ballet masters
Dancers from Zagreb